Claude Gaspar Bachet Sieur de Méziriac (9 October 1581 – 26 February 1638) was a French mathematician and poet born in Bourg-en-Bresse, at that time belonging to Duchy of Savoy. He wrote Problèmes plaisans et délectables qui se font par les nombres, Les éléments arithmétiques, and a Latin translation of the Arithmetica of Diophantus (the very translation where Fermat wrote a margin note about Fermat's Last Theorem). He also discovered means of solving indeterminate equations using continued fractions, a method of constructing magic squares, and a proof of Bézout's identity.

Biography 
Claude Gaspar Bachet de Méziriac was born in Bourg-en-Bresse. By the time he reached the age of six, both his mother (Marie de Chavanes) and his father (Jean Bachet) had died. He was then looked after by the Jesuit Order. For a year in 1601, Bachet was a member of the Jesuit Order (he left due to an illness).

Bachet lived a comfortable life in Bourg-en-Bresse. He married Philiberte de Chabeu in 1620 and had seven children.

Bachet was a pupil of the Jesuit mathematician Jacques de Billy at the Jesuit College in Rheims. They became close friends.

Bachet wrote the Problèmes plaisans et délectables qui se font par les nombres of which the first edition was issued in 1612, a second and enlarged edition was brought out in 1624; this contains an interesting collection of arithmetical tricks and questions, many of which are quoted in W. W. Rouse Ball's Mathematical Recreations and Essays.

He also wrote Les éléments arithmétiques, which exists in manuscript; and a translation, from Greek to Latin, of the Arithmetica of Diophantus (1621). It was this very translation in which Fermat wrote his famous margin note claiming that he had a proof of Fermat's Last Theorem. The same text renders Diophantus' term παρισὀτης as adaequalitat, which became Fermat's technique of adequality, a pioneering method of infinitesimal calculus.

Bachet was the earliest writer who discussed the solution of indeterminate equations by means of continued fractions. He also did work in number theory and found a method of constructing magic squares. 
In the second edition of his Problèmes plaisants (1624) he gives a proof of Bézout's identity (as proposition XVIII) 142 years before it got published by Bézout.

He was elected member of the Académie française in 1635.

Notes

References

Further reading
 
 Ad Meskens (2010), Travelling Mathematics: The Fate of Diophantos' Arithmetic (Science Networks. Historical Studies Book 41).

External links 
 Diophantus Alexandrinus, Pierre de Fermat, Claude Gaspard Bachet de Meziriac, Diophanti Alexandrini Arithmeticorum libri 6, et De numeris multangulis liber unus. Cum comm. C(laude) G(aspar) Bacheti et observationibus P(ierre) de Fermat. Acc. doctrinae analyticae inventum novum, coll. ex variis eiu. Tolosae 1670, .
Problèmes plaisans et délectables, qui se font par les nombres – digital copy at the Library of Congress

1581 births
1638 deaths
Writers from Bourg-en-Bresse
16th-century French Jesuits
French mathematicians
17th-century French mathematicians
17th-century French people
Members of the Académie Française
Number theorists
Magic squares
Greek–Latin translators
17th-century French translators